Endomorphins are considered to be natural opioid neurotransmitters central to pain relief. The two known endomorphins, endomorphin-1 and endomorphin-2, are tetrapeptides, consisting of Tyr-Pro-Trp-Phe and Tyr-Pro-Phe-Phe amino acid sequences respectively. These sequences fold into tertiary structures with high specificity and affinity for the μ-opioid receptor, binding it exclusively and strongly. Bound μ-opioid receptors typically induce inhibitory effects on neuronal activity. Endomorphin-like immunoreactivity exists within the central and peripheral nervous systems, where endomorphin-1 appears to be concentrated in the brain and upper brainstem, and endomorphin-2 in the spinal cord and lower brainstem. Because endomorphins activate the μ-opioid receptor, which is the target receptor of morphine and its derivatives, endomorphins possess significant potential as analgesics with reduced side effects and risk of addiction.

Opioids and receptors 

Endomorphins belong to the opiate class of neuropeptides (protein neurotransmitters). Opiates are ligands that bind opium-binding receptors and exist endogenously and synthetically. Endogenous opiates include endorphins, enkephalins, dynorphins, and endomorphins.

Transcription and translation of opiate-encoding genes results in the formation of pre-propeptide opiate precursors, which are modified in the endoplasmic reticulum to become propeptide opiate precursors, transferred to the golgi apparatus, and further modified into the opiate product. The exact pre-propeptide precursors of endomorphins have not been identified. Because the precursors have never been identified and the mechanisms by which the endomorphins are produced have never been clarified, the status of endomorphins as endogenous opioid ligands has to be considered tentative.

Opioid receptors belong to the G protein-coupled receptor family and include μ, κ, δ, and nociceptinorphanin-FQ receptors. While activation of opiate receptors initiates a diverse array of responses, opiates typically serve as depressants, and are widely used and developed as analgesics. Additionally, opiate malfunction has been linked to schizophrenia and autism. Endomorphins demonstrate high selectivity and affinity for the μ-opioid receptor, which functions in pain relief and intoxication.

Structure 
Both endomorphins-1 and 2 are tetrapeptides, consisting of four amino acids. Endomorphin-1 has the amino acid sequence of Tyr-Pro-Trp-Phe, while Endomorphin-2 has a sequence of Tyr-Pro-Phe-Phe. The specific amino acids in these sequences dictate the folding and resultant behavior, namely the ability to bind μ-opioid receptors, of these molecules.

Function 

Endomorphins maintain a variety of functions. Mechanistically, they bind inhibitory μ-opioid G-protein receptors, which act to close calcium ion channels and open potassium ion channels in the membranes of bound neurons. The elimination of calcium influx and facilitation of potassium ion efflux prevents neuronal depolarization, inhibits the generation of action potentials, and depresses the activity of excitatory neurons. In other instances, endomorphin binding causes excitation, where its activation of phospholipase C and adenylyl cyclase initiates an increase in calcium ion concentration, cellular depolarization, and the release of norepinephrine and serotonin.

The specific roles of endomorphins largely remain undetermined and depend upon the pathway in question. Opioid systems influence the physiological processes of pain, reward, and stress.  They also play roles in immune responses and the functions of the gastrointestinal, respiratory, cardiovascular, and neuroendocrine systems.

The concentration and resultant effect of most neurotransmitters, including endomorphins, is dictated by rates of synthesis and degradation. Degradation involves the breakdown of functional molecules to defective configurations or parts, thereby reducing the total activity of the molecule type. The enzyme, DPP IV, cleaves endomorphin into defective parts, thus regulating endomorphin activity.

Location 
The location of endomorphin activity has been isolated using radioimmunoassay and immunocytochemistry within human, mice, rat, and monkey nervous systems. Both endomorphin tetrapeptides can be found in certain areas of the brain. In the midbrain, endomorphin-1 can be found in the hypothalamus, thalamus, and striatum. Within the telencephalon, endomorphin-1 has been identified in the nucleus accumbens and lateral septum. In the hindbrain, more endomorphin-1 reactive neurons have been detected compared to endomorphin-2. Alternately, endomorphin-2 is predominantly found in the spinal cord, specifically in presynaptic terminals of afferent neurons in the dorsal horn region. It has been found co-localized with calcitonin as well as the pain-conveying neurotransmitter, substance P. Neither endomorphin-1 or 2 have been identified in the amygdala or the hippocampus.

Clinical application 
In addition to endomorphins, morphine and morphine-like opiates target the μ-opioid receptor. Thus, endomorphins pose significant potential as analgesics and morphine substitutes. In vitro assessment of endomorphins as analgesics reveals similar behavior to morphine and other opiates, where drug tolerance leads to dependence and addiction. Other side effects common to opiates such as vasodilation, respiratory depression, urinary retention, and gastrointestinal reaction develop. However, the endomorphin-induced side effects prove slightly less severe than those of the morphine-derived analgesics commonly used today. Additionally, endomorphins potentially produce more powerful analgesic effects than their morphine-derived counterparts.

Despite their pharmaceutical aptitude, the low membrane permeability and vulnerability to enzymatic degradation of endomorphins limits their incorporation into drugs. As a result, endomorphin analogues are being generated to allow transport across the blood brain barrier, increase stability, and reduce side effects. Two endomorphin modifications that approach these problems include glycosylation and lipidation. Glycosylation adds carbohydrate groups to the endomorphin molecules, allowing them to pass membranes through glucose transporters. Lipidation adds lipoamino acids or fatty acids to the endomorphin molecules, increasing hydrophobicity and, therefore, membrane permeability of the molecules.

References

Opioid peptides
Mu-opioid receptor agonists
Tetrapeptides